Sir James Miller  (16 March 190520 March 1977) was a Scottish businessman and politician, who served as Lord Provost of Edinburgh and Lord Mayor of London. As an architect, engineer and house-builder he founded the firm Miller Homes in 1934.

Life
He was born on 16 March 1905 the son of James Miller an Edinburgh architect. The family lived at 32 Bellevue Road at this time. He was educated at George Heriot's School. He then trained as an architect under his father. In 1925 he undertook his first design-build project after a developer withdrew from a project. In 1934, continuing in this vein, he formed James Miller & Partners with his brothers, which eventually was rebranded as Miller Homes.

In 1936 he became a town councillor in Edinburgh and in 1947 was City Treasurer. In post-war Britain his company expanded to cover all sections of the country.

From 1951 to 1954 he was Lord Provost of Edinburgh. He was succeeded by John Garnett Banks. In 1953 the University of Edinburgh awarded him an honorary doctorate (LLD).

Amongst his roles as Lord Provost he was part of BBC Scotland's first broadcast: on 14 March 1952 alongside presenters Mary Malcolm and Alastair Macintyre.

In 1955 he was elected a Fellow of the Royal Society of Edinburgh. His proposers were Charles Warr, Douglas Allan, Hugh Nisbet and Robert Lyon.

In 1964 he succeeded Sir James Harman as Lord Mayor of London and in 1965 was succeeded in turn by Sir Lionel Denny.

He retired as Director of Miller Homes in 1970 and was succeeded by his son James Miller. His nephew, Keith Miller, became Chief Executive.

He died on 20 March 1977.

Family

In 1933 he married Ella Jane Stewart.

Artistic recognition

Whilst Lord Provost he was painted by William Oliphant Hutchison. The painting is held by the City of Edinburgh Council.

Philanthropy

In 1967 he funded the training ship Malcolm Miller in memory of his son malcolm who had been killed in a car accident in 1965.

References

1905 births
1971 deaths
Businesspeople from Edinburgh
People educated at George Heriot's School
Lord Provosts of Edinburgh
20th-century lord mayors of London
20th-century English politicians
20th-century Scottish politicians
Scottish architects
Scottish philanthropists
Fellows of the Royal Society of Edinburgh
Knights Grand Cross of the Order of the British Empire
Scottish justices of the peace
20th-century Scottish engineers
20th-century Scottish businesspeople
Scottish knights
20th-century British philanthropists